George Jubb (1717–1787) was an Anglican priest.
 
Jubb was born in York and educated at Christ Church, Oxford.  He was Chaplain to William Wentworth, 2nd Earl of Strafford then served a curacy at St Thomas the Martyr, Oxford. He held incumbencies at Cliffe until 1751; and at Chenies and Todington after 1751. He was also Chaplain to Thomas Herring, Archbishop of York then Canterbury from 1743 to 1757. He was appointed Archdeacon of Middlesex in 1779; Regius Professor of Hebrew at Oxford in 1780; and Chancellor of the Diocese of York in 1781.

He died on 12 November 1887.

Notes

 
 

1717 births
Alumni of Christ Church, Oxford
Archdeacons of Middlesex
Regius Professors of Hebrew (University of Oxford)
1787 deaths
Clergy from York
People from Cliffe, Kent